Efekt Domina or Domino Effect is a Polish documentary series produced by TVN and Kulczyk Foundation since 2014. Its author Dominika Kulczyk reaches places affected by poverty, natural disasters and various social problems, offering support to organizations working for local communities. Through the stories presented in the series, Dominika Kulczyk presents examples of activities based on development assistance, partnership and volunteering.

The program has been broadcast every spring since 2014 on Sundays at 11:00 am (1st-6th season) and at 11:30 am (since 7th season) in TVN station.

References 

2014 Polish television series debuts
2010s Polish television series
2020s Polish television series
Polish documentary television series
TVN (Polish TV channel) original programming